"Ninety Years Without Slumbering" is episode 132 of the American television anthology series The Twilight Zone. The title comes from the lyrics of the song "My Grandfather's Clock", which is sung or played throughout the episode as a recurring motif. As in the song, main character Sam Forstmann (played by Ed Wynn) believes his life is tied to his clock's ticking.

Opening narration

Plot
Sam Forstmann is an old man who spends all of his time working on his grandfather clock, upsetting his pregnant granddaughter and her husband, with whom he resides. They press him into speaking with a psychiatrist friend of theirs. Sam confides in the psychiatrist that his father bought the clock on the day he was born, and that he will die if it stops ticking. The psychiatrist thinks this belief is merely a subconscious rationalization of Sam's obsession with the clock and advises him to sell it. In an effort to appease his family, Sam puts the clock up for sale. However, when a neighbor expresses interest in it, he offers to let her have it with payment indefinitely deferred and come by every two days to maintain it.

Two weeks after he sells the clock, the new owners go on vacation for the weekend, so Sam cannot wind the clock. Desperate, he tries breaking into the house, but a passing policeman is alerted by the sound of the window shattering and takes him back home. There he lies weakly in bed and resigns himself to death. The clock stops, and his "spirit" appears, informing him "It's time to go." He chooses to stop believing in the clock's power, declaring instead that he wants to live to see his great-grandchild grow up. He, therefore, continues to live (and the "spirit" vanishes).

The next morning, he tells his expectant granddaughter, "When that clock died, I was born again."

Closing narration

Production notes
"Ninety Years Without Slumbering" was a drastic reworking of an original script by George Clayton Johnson, "Tick of Time." Most notably, in "Tick of Time" the main character did indeed die when the clock stopped. Johnson did not approve of the changes made to his story, and was credited onscreen under a pseudonym.

This episode was Bernard Herrmann's final score for the series.

References
DeVoe, Bill. (2008). Trivia from The Twilight Zone. Albany, GA: Bear Manor Media. 
Grams, Martin. (2008). The Twilight Zone: Unlocking the Door to a Television Classic. Churchville, MD: OTR Publishing. 
Zicree, Marc Scott: The Twilight Zone Companion.  Sillman-James Press, 1982 (second edition)

External links

1963 American television episodes
The Twilight Zone (1959 TV series season 5) episodes
Compositions by Bernard Herrmann
Television episodes written by George Clayton Johnson